In the US, Broadcast Standards and Practices (often abbreviated to omit the first word) is the department at a television network which is responsible for moral, ethical, and legal issues.

Standards and Practices may also refer to:
 Standards & Practices (album) by American punk rock band Face to Face
 "Standards and Practices" (30 Rock), an episode of the American comedy series 30 Rock
 Standards and Practices, a previous name for the professional wrestling tag team The West Hollywood Blondes

See also 
 Standards And Recommended Practices in the aviation industry